Valerie Bloom MBE (born 1956) is a Jamaican-born poet and a novelist based in the UK.

Early life
Born in Clarendon Parish, Jamaica, Bloom moved to England in 1979. She attended the University of Kent at Canterbury and earned an honours degree, and was later awarded an honorary master's degree. She has been living in Kent ever since.

Works
Bloom has published several collections, the most recent of which is Whoop an' Shout! Her first collection was Touch Mi, Tell Mi, published by Bogle-L'Ouverture in 1983, and this was followed by Duppy Jamboree (Cambridge University Press, 1992), Let me Touch the Sky, The World is Sweet and Hot like Fire. She has also edited a number of collections, including One River Many Creeks  and A Twist in the Tale.

Bloom has written lyrics for world jazz ensemble Grand Union Orchestra, including "Can't Chain Up Me Mind" on their 1989 live show and album, Freedom Calls. The show featuring Bloom's lyrics was broadcast on BBC Radio 3 in January 1990.

Her first novel was Surprising Joy (2003). Her next novel, The Tribe, was published by Macmillan Children's Books in 2007.

She writes poetry both in English and Jamaican patois (and has been referred to as "a successor to Louise Bennett"). Many of her performances include a "crash course" in patois for audience members unfamiliar with the language. She has performed widely throughout the UK and abroad and has appeared on many radio and TV programmes. In 2005, she made a series of three programmes focusing on Jamaican poetry for BBC Radio 4 entitled Island Voices.

Awards and honours
She was appointed Member of the Order of the British Empire (MBE) in the 2008 New Year Honours.

Selected bibliography

Poetry
 Touch Mi! Tell Mi! (Bogle-L’Ouverture Press, 1983; revised edition 1990)

For children — poetry and picture books
 Duppy Jamboree (Cambridge University Press, 1992)
 Ackee, Breadfruit, Callaloo: An Edible Alphabet, illustrated by Kim Harley (Bogle-L’Ouverture and Macmillan Caribbean, 1999)
 Fruits, illustrated by David Axtell (Macmillan Children's Books, 1997, ; 2000)
 Let Me Touch The Sky: Selected Poems for Children (Macmillan Children's Books, 2000)
 When Granny (Macmillan Children's Books, 2000)
 The World Is Sweet: Poems (Bloomsbury Children's Books, 2000, ; paperback )
 New Baby, illustrated by David Axtell (Macmillan Children's Books, 2001)
 Hot Like Fire and Other Poems (Bloomsbury Children's Books, 2002, ; paperback )
 Whoop an’ Shout: Poems (Macmillan Children's Books, 2003, ; paperback )
 Jaws and Claws and Things With Wings: Poems, illustrated by Matt Robertson (HarperCollins, 2013)
 Mighty Mountains, Swirling Seas, illustrated by Alessandra Cimatoribus (HarperCollins, 2015)

Novels
 Surprising Joy (Macmillan Children's Books, 2003; paperback )
 The Tribe (Macmillan Children's Books, 2007, ; paperback )

Anthologies (edited)
 On a Camel to the Moon, and Other Poems About Journeys (Belitha Press [now Chrysalis Books], 2001)
 The River, Many Creeks: Poems from All Around the World (Macmillan Children's Books, 2003, ; paperback )
 A Twist in the Tale: Surprising poems chosen by Valerie Bloom (Macmillan Children's Books, 2005)

Guides
 On Good Form – Poetry Made Simple (Apples & Snakes, 2005)

References

External links

Official website
Valerie Bloom website on Authors Abroad School Author Visits
 Granny Is
A Journey Through the Senses

1956 births
Living people
Women anthologists
20th-century Jamaican poets
Alumni of the University of Kent
Black British women writers
Children's poets
English people of Jamaican descent
Members of the Order of the British Empire
Women children's writers
21st-century Jamaican poets
21st-century British novelists